The Glamorgan Archives, previously known as the Glamorgan Record Office, is a county record office and repository based in Leckwith, Cardiff, Wales. It holds records for the whole of the historic county of Glamorgan but primarily for the post-1974 counties of Mid and South Glamorgan.

Background

Glamorgan County Council created Glamorgan Record Office in 1939 (the second county archive in Wales) with Emyr Gwynne Jones becoming Wales' first full-time archivist. The Record Office was based in the Glamorgan County Hall in Cathays Park, Cardiff. Following the local government reorganisation in 1974 Glamorgan was split into three (West, Mid and South) and in 1982 the records for the West Glamorgan area were moved to Swansea. In 1989 severe problems with damp were discovered in the Glamorgan Record Office strongrooms, leading to the public search room being closed for 4 months.

In the 2000s plans were made to move the archives to a new site. A proposed move to a new building near Callaghan Square fell through in 2006. In 2007 a site was found off Sloper Road, part of the new Leckwith Development which included the new Cardiff City Stadium. The new Glamorgan Archives building was completed in 2009 and officially opened in Spring 2010.

An appeal against Glamorgan Archives' business rates backfired in 2010, resulting in the rates bill increasing from £150,000 to £400,000 per year. Glamorgan Archives were forced to reduce from 17 to 14 staff to be able to pay the extra cost.

Since April 2020, the current Glamorgan Archivist is Laura Cotton who took over from Susan Edwards after 24 years of service.

Services
Glamorgan Archives currently provides archive services for Cardiff, Bridgend, Caerphilly, Merthyr Tydfil, Rhondda Cynon Taf and the Vale of Glamorgan councils.

In late 2015 material from Carmarthenshire Archives were transferred to Cardiff, following a severe outbreak of mould at Carmarthenshire's Parc Myrddin building.

Glamorgan Archivists

The following list shows the tenures of each Glamorgan Archivist since its inception in 1939.

1939: Emyr Gwynne Jones (tenure disrupted by World War II)
1946-1973: Madeline Elsas
1973-1993: Patricia Moore
1993-1996: Annette Burton 
1996-2020: Susan Edwards
2020–present: Laura Cotton

See also
Leckwith development
Gwent Archives

References

External links
 
 

Archives in Wales
Buildings and structures in Cardiff
Government buildings completed in 2009
Glamorgan